The 2003–04 All-Ireland Senior Club Football Championship was the 34th staging of the All-Ireland Senior Club Football Championship since its establishment by the Gaelic Athletic Association in 1970-71. The championship began on 19 October 2003 and ended on 17 March 2004.

Nemo Rangers were the defending champions, however, failed to qualify after being beaten by Na Piarsaigh in the third round of the 2003 Cork County Championship.

On 17 March 2004, Caltra won the championship following a 0-13 to 0-12 defeat of An Ghaeltcaht in the All-Ireland final at Croke Park. It remains their only championship title.

Caltra's Michael Meehan was the championship's top scorer with 4-19.

Team changes

The Waterford club champions did not contest the Munster Club Championship due to a delay in the completion of the Waterford County Championship.

Results

Connacht Senior Club Football Championship

Quarter-final

Semi-finals

Final

Leinster Senior Club Football Championship

First round

Quarter-finals

Semi-finals

Final

Munster Senior Club Football Championship

Quarter-finals

Semi-finals

Final

Ulster Senior Club Football Championship

Preliminary round

Quarter-finals

Semi-finals

Final

All-Ireland Senior Club Football Championship

Quarter-final

Semi-finals

Final

Championship statistics

Top scorers

Overall

In a single game

Miscellaneous
 Caltra won the Connacht Club Championship for the first time in their history.
 St. Brigid's won the Leinster Club Championship for the first time in their history.
 An Ghaeltacht won the  Munster Club Championship for the first time in their history.
 The Loup won the  Ulster Club Championship for the first time in their history.

References

2003 in Gaelic football
2004 in Gaelic football